Võõbu is a village in Paide Parish, Järva County in northern-central Estonia.

References

Villages in Järva County
Governorate of Estonia